The Panthers is a New Zealand drama television miniseries created and executive produced by Halaifonua Finau and Tom Hern in association with Four Knights Film studio. Set during the 1970s, the series focuses on the emergence of the Polynesian Panthers against the backdrop of the controversial dawn raids. The series was released by public broadcaster TVNZ on 15 August on TVNZ 1 and TVNZ On Demand. The series starred Dimitrius Schuster-Koloamatangi as Polynesian Panthers leader Will Ilolahia, and was written by Tom Hern and Halaifonua Finau.

Synopsis
Set in Auckland in 1974, The Panthers focuses on how a group of Polynesian students and street gangsters led by Tongan student Will 'Ilolahia formed a revolutionary movement called the Polynesian Panthers, drawing inspiration from the American Black Panther Party. The miniseries is set against the backdrop of racial tensions between white and Polynesian New Zealanders, the dawn raids on overstayers, and the premiership of Prime Minister Robert Muldoon.

Cast and characters

Episodes

Production
The Polynesian Panther script was written by Tom Hern and Halaifonua Finau, who also worked as executive producers. Other executive producers included James Napier Robertson, Polynesian Panthers' founder Will 'Ilolahia and Kini Roy Earley. Key cast members included Dimitrius Schuster-Koloamatangi as 'Ilolahia, Beulah Koale, Frankie Adams, Roy Billing as Robert Muldoon, Lealani Siaosi, Chelsie Preston Crayford, Jordan Mooney, Jordan Vaha'akolo, Villa Junior Lemanu, Rokalani Lavea and Ravikanth Gurunathan. The series also had a majority Pasifika cast. 

The miniseries was produced by Hern and Finau’s production company Tavake, in association with Four Nights Films. Commissioned by TVNZ, it received NZ$5.5 million in funding and a platform contribution relief of NZ$336,000 from NZ On Air. Several musicians including Troy Kingi, Choicevaughan, and Diggy Dupé compiled a full-length album for the series' soundtrack. Some songs used in the series' soundtrack included First Take Strut, Keep your head up, Ulu Up, Donny Hathaway, Must Seem Popular, and All for Show.

Release
A trailer for The Panthers was launched on 21 July 2021. The miniseries was released by public broadcaster TVNZ on 15 August on TVNZ 1 and TVNZ On Demand. To promote the series, TVNZ also released a documentary series called The Panthers Rapp: The Next Chapter, to provide historical context for the series. 

The miniseries was screened at the 2021 Toronto International Film Festival's Primetime section in September 2021.

Reception
Stuff reviewer James Croot described the series as "a well put-together dramatisation of a dark chapter in New Zealand chapter," praising director Miki Magasiva's production and costume design. While praising Schuster-Koloamatangi's performance as the main protagonist Will 'Ilolahia, Croot criticised the underdevelopment of some of the characters and described Roy Billing's portrayal of Prime Minister Muldoon as a "caricature of his later days in office, rather than the beginning."

The Spinoff reviewer Dan Taipua praised the series for shining a "bold light" on the history of the Polynesian Panthers and the dawn raids in New Zealand. He also praised Billing for demystifying Muldoon as a simple-minded populist who exploited racism. In addition, Taipua praised the performances of Schuster-Koloamatangi, Frankie Adams and Beulah Koale. Taipua also compared The Panthers to other radical films and TV shows such as Spike Lee's BlackkKlansman and Shaka King's Judas and the Black Messiah.

Notes and references

External links
 
 

2021 New Zealand television series debuts
2020s New Zealand television series
New Zealand drama television series
Polynesian-New Zealand culture